SS Salvador Brau was a Liberty ship built in the United States during World War II. She was named after Salvador Brau, a journalist, poet, dramatist, novelist, historian, and sociologist. He was designated the official historian of Puerto Rico in 1903, by the first American-appointed governor William Henry Hunt.

Construction
Salvador Brau was laid down on 8 November 1943, under a Maritime Commission (MARCOM) contract, MC hull 1543, by J.A. Jones Construction, Panama City, Florida; she was launched on 15 December 1943.

History
She was allocated to William J. Rountree Company, on 31 January 1944. On 1 June 1948, she was laid up in the National Defense Reserve Fleet, in Beaumont, Texas. On 16 November 1966, she was sold for $45,179.79 to Southern Scrap Material Co., Ltd., for scrapping. She was withdrawn from the fleet on 21 December 1966.

References

Bibliography

 
 
 
 
 

 

Liberty ships
Ships built in Panama City, Florida
1944 ships
Beaumont Reserve Fleet